Alejandro Omar Simionato  (born 5 August 1971 in Mercedes, Buenos Aires) is a retired Argentine football player who played for a number of clubs both in Argentina and Europe, including Club Atlético San Lorenzo de Almagro, Club Atlético Lanús and UD Las Palmas.

External links
 Statistics at FutbolXXI.com  
 Statistics at LFP.es 

1971 births
Living people
Sportspeople from Buenos Aires Province
Argentine footballers
San Lorenzo de Almagro footballers
Club Atlético Lanús footballers
Racing Club de Avellaneda footballers
UD Las Palmas players
Club Deportivo Universidad Católica footballers
Argentine Primera División players
Argentine expatriate footballers
Expatriate footballers in Chile
Expatriate footballers in Spain
Association football defenders